Clarence United Football Club was an amateur soccer club based in the City of Clarence, Tasmania, which competed in the NPL Tasmania, the second tier of the sport in the country below the A-League. Founded in 1978 the club spent much of its early history competing in lower divisions, where it has been reasonably successful, winning several lower division titles and cups. Despite this, Clarence United had struggled for many years to attain success at the highest level within the state, although Clarence United was finally crowned state champions for the first time in 2009.  At the conclusion of the 2019 season, they merged with Hobart Zebras FC to form Clarence Zebras FC.

Clarence United played their home games at Wentworth Park, an impressive multiple pitch venue located alongside Howrah Beach in the Clarence, Tasmania with good quality playing surfaces and club facilities.

History
In the 1970s there was a lack of association football clubs in the Municipality of Clarence on Hobart's eastern shore, with most of the southern clubs located in Hobart. A group of keen players, many of whom were from the Scottish Australian expatriate community held a meeting in October 1977 to discuss the possibility of forming a new club to enter the 1978 southern competition. The club was formed in 1978 as Phoenix Rovers Soccer Club,  and originally wore a Scotland International strip for home matches, and a plain red T-shirt as an alternative away strip. The original committee was Syd Cairns, Mike Barter, Ken Ellison, Trevor Davey, Lloyd Davey, with Syd Cairns appointed as the first coach of the team. Cairns performed this role as an active player-coach. The club only had enough players to form one team in their first season, and were entered into the Southern Division Two competition. The team finished 3rd in a 22 team Division Two competition in their first season.

In 1979 the name was changed to Phoenix Lauderdale Rovers after amalgamating with Lauderdale Soccer Club which gave them enough players to form a reserve team, and in that season the club won their first accolade, being crowned Division Two champions. The club's colours were also changed to the current red and black design. In 1982, they met with Clarence Soccer Club to discuss a merger, but it did not go ahead at that time. The Phoenix team of that season was quite strong, and had on-field success by winning the Rothmans Division One league title and the Michael The Tailors Pre-Season Cup. At the time, Division One was the second tier of football behind the Statewide League, but victory in Division One did not necessarily mean promotion, as there were additional financial requirements for membership in the State League. Phoenix defended their Division One title the following year, and also added the Summer Cup, but were again not promoted to the State League. 1984 was less successful, with the only trophy going to the Division Four reserve side. The merger with Clarence eventually went ahead that year, and a meeting was held where it was agreed the name would change to "PCL United" (Phoenix Clarence Lauderdale). The following year the new PCL United Soccer Club again won the Michael The Tailors Pre-Season Cup Winners, but were unable to follow it up with any league success. The late 1980s brought a fairly barren period for the club, although they picked up a few minor lower division trophies, they were unable to secure any major successes.

Phoenix won the Division Two title in 1989, and backed it up with success in the Knock-out cup, giving them a 'double'. In the early 1990s the club invested in building a new clubhouse, bar and changing room complex in the middle of the Wentworth Park complex. It was the catalyst for a period of major improvement. Junior development teams were highly successful, and dominated many of the age-groups of the Eastern Region Junior Soccer Association competitions. A new cohesion developed as players grew up playing together from a young age, and by 1994 the club had won the Knock-out cup once more. That side, under coach Darren Grainger, led a barnstorming year the following season, as they were crowned Division One winners. It was the club's first senior league success in twelve years. Phoenix also managed to claim the Division Two, and Division Four titles, as well as back-to-back KO Cups. 1996 did not bring league success, but the KO Cup and reserve KO cup were secured, and in 1997 they came second in Division One.

At the start of the 1998 season, Soccer Tasmania led a move for clubs to distance themselves from their traditional ethnic associations on the initiative of Soccer Australia. it was felt that these associations were the cause of many of the problems and violence that plagued football in Australia. Although Phoenix did not have any obvious ethnic connotations, the club used the opportunity to rename itself as Clarence United Football Club. In their first season under their new identity, Clarence United again took the Division One title. After years of trying, Clarence United was finally able to secure entry into the Statewide League for the first time in the 1999 season. Their first season in the Statewide league was an awakening, and proved disastrous. Clarence finished last with only two wins out of sixteen matches, and a goal difference of −55. Even worse, after finally achieving promotion to the Statewide League after so many years of trying, the league was wound up at the end of the 1999 season because of financial troubles. Clarence returned to the Southern Premier League for the 2000 season, but they only fared slightly better, finishing second last ahead of South Hobart. Clarence finished second last every season between 2000 and 2003.

2004 saw a turn around in the club's fortunes, claiming fourth spot in the Southern Premier League. In the mid-2000s, Clarence fairly consistently managed mid-table results, but 2009 brought a long-awaited first-ever Forestry Tasmania State Championship title, and in the same season Clarence United were crowned Premier Men's Statewide Lakoseljac Cup Winners, earning the club a first-ever senior 'double'.

At the end of the 2019 season, they merged with Hobart Zebras to form Clarence Zebras FC.

Colours and crest

In their first two seasons, Phoenix originally wore a Scotland International strip for home matches, and a plain red T-shirt as an alternative away strip. The main team currently wears a shirt which is predominantly black, with black shorts, and black socks. The Club is currently sponsored by Flooring Xtra, Subway, Just Cuts and others. All of the club's teams were the red and black colour combination, but utilise a variety of different design styles to differential between divisional and age-group teams.

Although the club is no longer known by the name "Phoenix", a phoenix rising out of flames is still the club logo.

Ground

Clarence United play their home games at Wentworth Park. Located off Clarence Street in Howrah, Wentworth Park is a picturesque ground surrounded by trees and adjoining Howrah Beach in a primarily residential suburban area. The Wentworth Park complex is used by other sports such as hockey, rugby, touch football, and Ultimate Frisbee tournaments. In the summer it is used as a cricket ground. However the three main football pitches occupy the largest section of the complex, and the Clarence United club house, bar and changing facility is the main building on site. Although their home ground has good quality playing surfaces and club facilities, there is no stadium, grandstand or seating available.

The ground is not owned by the club, but is a Clarence City Council facility who lease the ground to the club on a long-term basis on the proviso that other sports be permitted to share the facilities with Clarence United. The site was originally coastal lagoons, and the city council had historically used the site as landfill rubbish tip. In 2003, the ground was featured in the media on ABC Stateline, when local residents suggested that DDTs, and other organochlorides had been used to control vermin and mosquitoes when the site was a rubbish dump, and that these chemicals were responsible for higher than usual rates of diseases such as cancer in the local area. An investigation was carried out, collecting soil, groundwater and soil gas data. An environmental assessment report was published in response, suggesting that the human health risk posed by latent chemicals was negligible.

In 2008 the council and the club jointly financed the installation of modern ground lighting which angered some local residents.

Players

Current squad

Men's Coaching Staff

National Premier League Tasmania

Head Coach: Warren Burt

Challenge league

Head Coach: Bob Nicholson

Women's Coaching Staff

Women's Super League

Coach: Chris Chalker

Assistant:

Managers

Seasons

Honours and statistics
1979 Div. 2 Winners, Div. 4 KO Cup Runners-up.
1980 Div. 3 KO Cup Runners-up.
1982 Rothmans League Div. 1 Winners, Michael The Tailors Pre-Season Cup Winners.
1983 Div. 1 Winners, Summer Cup Winners.
1984 Div. 4 KO Cup Runners-up.
1985 Michael The Tailors Pre-Season Cup Winners.
1988 Div. 3 KO Cup Runners-up.
1989 Div. 2 Winners, Div. 2 KO Cup Winners.
1991 Div. 2 KO Cup Winners.
1994 KO Cup Winners.
1995 Div. 1 Winners, Div. 2 Winners, Div. 4 Winners, KO Cup Winners.
1997 League Runners-up, KO Cup Winners, Social Cup Winners.
1998 Div. 1 Winners, Div. 1 Reserves Winners.
1999 Div. 3 Winners.
2001 Div. 2 Winners.
2002 Div. 2 Winners.
2003 Div. 2 Winners, Women's Div. 1 Winners.
2007 Under 19 Winners, Div. 3 Winners, Women's Statewide Cup Runners-up.
2008 Under 19 Winners, Women's Statewide Cup Runners-up.
2009 Forestry Tasmania State Championship Winners, Premier Men's Statewide Lakoseljac Cup Winners, Southern Under 19 Cup Winners, Women's Statewide Cup Runners-up.
2010 Women's Premier League Champions, Women's Statewide Cup Runners-up, Women's Div 1 Winners, Statewide KO Cup Runners-up, Div 3 White Winners, Div 3 Grandfinal Winners

References

External links
Clarence United – Official Website

Association football clubs established in 1978
Association football clubs disestablished in 2019
Defunct soccer clubs in Australia
Defunct soccer clubs in Tasmania
1978 establishments in Australia
2019 disestablishments in Australia